Yaylabeli can refer to:

 Yaylabeli, Burdur
 Yaylabeli, Mudurnu
 Yaylabeli, Refahiye